Bahaddur Gandu is a 1976 Indian Kannada-language swashbuckler film directed by A. V. Sheshagiri Rao, starring Rajkumar, Jayanthi, Aarathi and Vajramuni. The movie saw a theatrical run of 19 weeks. The story was penned by the celebrated playwright H. V. Subba Rao based on William Shakespeare's play The Taming of the Shrew.

Plot
Rajkumar plays an upright Panju, who stays in Bankapura with his mother. Due to the evil policies of crown prince Vajramuni and princess Jayanti, Panju and villagers are at the risk of losing their lands. When much pleading does not work, Panju leads farmers agitation to the palace, where he is captured, put to jail, and tortured. Panju escapes from the prison, kidnaps Jayanti to his village to teach her civic norms, and shows her the harsh realities normal people face each day. He gets the entire village relocated across the adjoining river, so that royal soldiers cannot trace them. He is able to turn the princess to appreciate the normal way-of-life, but faces the wrath of the Palace and administration. Can he turn the tides and win his biggest battle? The film also stars Arathi as a village girl who is in love with Panju, who gets killed by Vajramuni for thwarting his advances.

Cast
 Rajkumar as Panju
 Aarathi 
 Jayanthi as Kamala, the arrogant princess
 Balakrishna
 Vajramuni as the prince who kills his own brother, Kamala's elder brother 
 Dwarakish as Panju's friend 
 Rajashankar
 Thoogudeepa Srinivas as commander-in-chief 
 Rajanand
 Joker Shyam
 Shani Mahadevappa as a villager
 Venkataraju
 Kunigal Ramnath
B. Jaya as a villager

Soundtrack

M. Ranga Rao composed the soundtrack, and lyrics were written by Chi. Udaya Shankar. The album consists of five soundtracks.

References

External links
 

1970s Kannada-language films
1976 films
Indian action drama films
Films scored by M. Ranga Rao
Films with screenplays by Chi. Udayashankar
Films directed by A. V. Seshagiri Rao
1970s action drama films